Arsène Lupin is a 2004 French adventure crime film directed by Jean-Paul Salomé, based on the popular series of crime novels created by Maurice Leblanc. An international co-production of France, Spain, Italy and the United Kingdom, the film stars Romain Duris, Kristin Scott Thomas and Pascal Greggory.

Plot
The film follows gentleman thief Arsène Lupin from a small boy, through the death of his father, and his adult years when he meets the strange woman, Joséphine, who appears to be immortal and uses a hypnotic drug to enslave people to her will. Arsène's ethos is to steal from the rich and deserving crooks. In this film he comes up against two parties, a secret society and Joséphine, who are intent on gathering three crucifixes which will reveal the secret of a lost treasure which contains secrets about Mehdi.

Cast
 Romain Duris as Arsène Lupin
 Kristin Scott Thomas as Joséphine Balsamo, comtesse de Cagliostro
 Pascal Greggory as Beaumagnan
 Eva Green as Clarisse de Dreux-Soubise
 Robin Renucci as Duke of Dreux-Soubise
 Patrick Toomey as Léonard
 Mathieu Carrière as Duke of Orléans
 Philippe Magnan as Bonnetot
 Philippe Lemaire as Cardinal of Etigues
 Marie Bunel as Henriette d'Andrésy
 Aurélien Wiik as Jean Lupin
 Philippe Laudenbach as The Prefect
 Françoise Lépine as The Duchess
 Xavier Beauvois as Doctor
 Arthur Dupont as Seller Newspaper

Production
The film adapts elements from many of Leblanc's stories, including The Arrest of Arsène Lupin (the ship gala which introduces the adult Lupin), The Queen's Necklace (Lupin's childhood), Sherlock Holmes Arrives Too Late, The Hollow Needle (which provides the treasure that is a key component of the plot), 813, and The Countess Of Cagliostro (which brought over one of Lupin's recurring antagonists).

Reception
Lisa Nesselson of Variety dubbed the film, 'A thoroughly entertaining period romp bursting with intrigue'. Empire awarded the film 3 out of five stars, criticizing Duris' performance, but complimenting the action and special effects. Screen Daily praised the production values, but found the plot unclear.

References

External links
 
 Arsene Lupin at Rotten Tomatoes

2004 films
2000s adventure films
2000s crime films
Arsène Lupin films
2000s French-language films
Films directed by Jean-Paul Salomé
Films set in the 1880s
Films set in the 1890s
Films set in the 1900s
Films set in the 1910s
French heist films
2000s heist films
2000s French films